Michael Hugh Taylor (born 6 December 1988 in Ballymena, County Antrim) is an historian and a former Irish first-class cricketer who played for Cambridge University Cricket Club from 2008 to 2014.
He received his B.A., M.Phil. and Ph.D. in History as a student of Gonville and Caius College at Cambridge University, and was a member of the Gonville and Caius team that won the 2015 University Challenge. He has published two books, The Interest: How the British Establishment Resisted the Abolition of Slavery (2020), and with the political scientist Michael S. Kochin, An Independent Empire: Diplomacy & War in the Making of the United States (2020).

References

External links
 
 
 Michael Taylor's Amazon Author page

1988 births
Living people
Irish cricketers
Sportspeople from Ballymena
Cambridge University cricketers
Cricketers from Northern Ireland
Cambridge MCCU cricketers
Contestants on University Challenge